Leucoptera caffeina is a species of moth. This leaf miner is one of several related pests on Coffea species. It is found in Angola, Zaire, Kenya and Tanzania in Africa. Other coffee leafminers include Leucoptera coffeella.

References

Leucoptera (moth)
Agricultural pest insects
Moths of Africa
Moths described in 1940